Los Donneños were a 1950s Mexican Norteño duo formed by Ramiro Cavazos and Mario Montes and named after Donna, Texas. Ramiro Cavazos was the lead singer and played the bajo sexto, while Mario Montes was second voice and played the accordion. On some recordings they were joined by a string bass player, Rafael Gaspar.

Cavazos met Montes while working as a migrant laborer near Donna, Texas.  They had been acquainted through their manual labor, but joined forces musically after Cavazos noticed Montes playing music by the side of the road.  They formed a duet named after the Texas town, and continued to work as migrant laborers even after making records for Falcon Records and developing a following that spanned both sides of the United States-Mexican border. In the 1970s and 1980s Ramiro Cavazos had a record store on South 23rd Street in McAllen, Texas.

References

American norteño musicians
Norteño music groups
Tejano music groups
Musical groups from Texas
American Latin musical groups
Spanish-language singers of the United States
Musicians from Nuevo León